The Havana Perfectos were a minor league baseball franchise based in Havana, Illinois in 1908. The Havana Perfectos played as charter members of the Class D level Illinois-Missouri League and hosted minor league home games at Riverside Park.

History 
Minor league baseball began in Havana, Illinois in 1908. The Havana "Perfectos" became charter members of the six–team Class D level Illinois-Missouri League. The Canton Chinks, Galesburg Hornets, Hannibal Cannibals, Macomb Potters and Monmouth Browns franchises joined Havana as charter members of the league.

Beginning league play on May 12, 1908, Havana placed 3rd in the 1908 Illinois–Missouri League final standing. The Perfectos ended the season with a 58–60 record, playing under managers Mike Sampson and Fred Kommers. Havana finished 10.0 games behind the 1st place Hannibal Cannibals in the final Illinois–Missouri League standings. The six–team league standings were headed Hannibal (68–49), followed by the Macomb Potters (66–53), Havana Perfectos (58–60), Canton Chinks (56–61), Monmouth Browns (55–62) and Galesburg Hornets (50–67).

Havana player/manager Fred Kommers won the Illinois–Missouri League batting championship with a .349 average and the home run title, hitting 11. Kommers also led the league with 153 total hits and 75 runs scored.

The Havana Perfectos folded following the 1908 season. The Hannibal franchise also left the league and the two teams and were replaced by the Pekin Celestials and Beardstown Infants in the 1909 Illinois–Missouri League.

Havana, Illinois has not hosted another minor league team.

The ballpark
The Havana Perfectos hosted home minor league home games at Riverside Park. Today, Riverside Park is still in use as a public park. The park is located at 100 West Main Street at the Illinois River, Havana, Illinois.

Year–by–year record

Notable alumni

Fred Kommers (1908, MGR)

See also
Havana Perfectos players

References

External links
Havana, IL - Baseball Reference

Defunct minor league baseball teams
Professional baseball teams in Illinois
Defunct baseball teams in Illinois
Baseball teams established in 1908
Baseball teams disestablished in 1908
Illinois-Missouri League teams
Mason County, Illinois